The Chester Beatty Library, now known as the Chester Beatty, is a museum and library in Dublin. It was established in Ireland in 1950, to house the collections of mining magnate, Sir Alfred Chester Beatty. The present museum, on the grounds of Dublin Castle, opened on 7 February 2000, the 125th anniversary of Beatty's birth and was named European Museum of the Year in 2002.

The museum's collections are displayed in two galleries: "Sacred Traditions" and "Arts of the Book". Both displays exhibit manuscripts, miniature paintings, prints, drawings, rare books and some decorative arts from the Persian, Islamic, East Asian and Western Collections. The Chester Beatty is one of the premier sources for scholarship in both the Old and New Testaments and is home to one of the most significant collections of Western, Islamic and East & South East Asian artefacts. The museum also offers numerous temporary exhibitions, many of which include works of art on loan from foreign institutions and collections. The museum contains a number of priceless objects, including one of the surviving volumes of the first illustrated Life of the Prophet and the Gospel of Mani believed to be the last remaining artefact from Manichaeism.

Collections

Western Collections
The Western Collection houses many illuminated manuscripts, rare books and Old Master prints and drawings. With biblical texts written in Armenian, Church Slavonic, Coptic, Ge’ez, Greek, Latin and Syriac, the collection's Christian material comes from diverse cultural and geographical backgrounds. The papyrus codices in the Chester Beatty include Papyrus 45 and Papyrus 46 among others which are some of the earliest surviving Christian artefacts in the world. In addition, a significant proportion of the rare printed books and prints are also Christian in focus. The collection of papyri is one of the most extensive in the world and includes almost the entire corpus of Ancient Egyptian Love Songs.

Islamic Collections
The Islamic Collection is divided between the Arabic, Persian, Turkish, Qur'an and Mughal-Era Indian Collections. The Arabic texts include treatises on religion, history, jurisprudence, medicine, geography, mathematics, astronomy and linguistics. Some of the finest miniatures from imperial Mughal albums, called Muraqqa', are housed in the Chester Beatty Library, with important paintings from the Late Shah Jahan Album and the Minto Album. The albums were the subject of an exhibition and publication by the Islamic curator, Dr Elaine Wright, Muraqqa': Imperial Albums of the Chester Beatty Library. Often on display is the Ibn al-Bawwab Qur'an, copied by one of the greatest medieval Islamic calligraphers.

Persian Collection
The Persian collection contains various miniatures and manuscripts of classical Persian poets such as Ferdowsi and Nizami.

East Asian Collections
The East Asian Collection has one of the most extensive collections of carved snuff bottles, many of which were included in the catalogue, The Chester Beatty Library, Dublin: Chinese Snuff Bottles. It also has Japanese art, including a pair of long picture-scrolls painted in the 17th century by Kanō Sansetsu.

Collection highlights

Arabic collection

Armenian collection

Biblical papyri collection

Burmese collection

Chinese collection

Coptic collection

Egyptian Papyrus collection

Ethiopian collection

Hebrew collection

Indian collection

Indian (non-Mughal) collection

Islamic collection

Japanese collection

Papyrus collection

Persian collection

Syriac collection

Thai collection

Turkish collection

Western collection

Western Miscellaneous collection

Western Prints and Drawings collection

Others

References

External links 

   Meeting at the Chester Beatty, read by Catherine Ann Cullen
Chester Beatty Library within Google Arts & Culture

Archives in the Republic of Ireland
Libraries in Dublin (city)
Decorative arts museums in Ireland
Literary museums in Ireland
Museums in Dublin (city)
Art museums and galleries in the Republic of Ireland
Asian art museums
Libraries established in 1950
Library buildings completed in 2000
1950 establishments in Ireland

21st-century architecture in the Republic of Ireland